The Republican Movement of Karelia (Russian: Республиканское Движение Карелии) or Karelian Republican Movement (Finnish: Karjalan Tasavallan Liike; Karelian: Karjalan Tazavallan Liike) or RMK was a Karelian regionalist and separatist  organization founded by a Russian philosopher and author Vadim Vladimirovich Shtepa and registered in January 2014. The organization became inactive after Vadim Shtepa was arrested in December 2015  and was dissolved in August 2019.

History

The RMK started off as an internet forum created in the late 2000s but later registered as a public organization on the 10th of January 2014. The organization participated in various protests, such as protests for the transfer of jurisdiction of the Kizhi Pogost back from the Russian Ministry of Culture to the government of the Republic of Karelia and the protest against visa-free travel between Russia and Central Asian countries.

The RMK also focused on expanding and popularizing Karelian culture with projects such as National Kyykkä Assoсiation and Onegaborg radio, which only broadcast songs from Karelia.
The organization also had candidates during the 2014 Petrozavodsk city council election but did not secure any seats.
On 4 December 2015, Vadim Shtepa was arrested for distribution of extremist materials on the same day an article was posted on Respublika, the news website of the government of the Republic of Karelia, where the Head of the Republic of Karelia, Aleksandr Hudilainen, condemns Shtepa of extremism, saying that “extremists will have no will either in Petrozavodsk or in Karelia”.After this incident, Vadim Shtepa moved to Estonia.

The organization continued to legally exist under the leadership of Emelyanova Ekaterina Valentinovna until its liquidation on the 14th of August 2019.

Goals
RMK was originally created as an organization that aimed to gain more autonomy for the Republic of Karelia as a part of the Russian Federation, however, over the years it became more separatist in nature.
Other goals included the creation of a multi-cultural state of Russians, Karelians, Finns, Vepsians, Zaonezhians, Pomors and other ethnic groups of Karelia; creation of parliamentary republic and diversification of the economy; renaming of streets and cities to more Karelian names; liquidation of "United Russia" in Karelia and the law enforcement agencies serving it; revival of the transboundary project "Euroregion Karelia"; ecological protection and technological modernization of the country.

The movement rejected the idea of unifying with Finland, seeing it as "a colony wanting to change its overlord".

References 

Karelia
Separatism in Russia
Nationalist organizations
History of Karelia
Regionalism (politics)
2014 establishments in Russia
2019 disestablishments in Russia